The Women's snowboard slopestyle competition at the FIS Freestyle Ski and Snowboarding World Championships 2019 will be held on February 9 and 10, 2019.

The final was cancelled due to weather conditions and the qualification results were used to determine the final ranking.

Qualification
The qualification was started on February 9, at 12:10. The eight best snowboarders qualified for the final.

Final

References

Women's snowboard slopestyle